Aleksandr Yuryevich Yushin (born 4 April 1995) is a Russian professional footballer who plays for Ural Yekaterinburg.

Club career
On 12 January 2022, he signed a 2.5-year contract with Russian Premier League club Ural Yekaterinburg. Yushin made his RPL debut for Ural on 7 March 2022 against FC Krasnodar.

Career statistics

References

External links 
 
 

1995 births
Footballers from Moscow
Living people
Russian footballers
Association football midfielders
FC Spartak Moscow players
FK Teteks players
Ulisses FC players
FC Belshina Bobruisk players
FC Khimik-Arsenal players
FC Neftekhimik Nizhnekamsk players
FC Ural Yekaterinburg players
Armenian Premier League players
Belarusian Premier League players
Russian Second League players
Belarusian First League players
Russian First League players
Russian Premier League players
Russian expatriate footballers
Expatriate footballers in North Macedonia
Russian expatriate sportspeople in North Macedonia
Expatriate footballers in Armenia
Russian expatriate sportspeople in Armenia
Expatriate footballers in Belarus
Russian expatriate sportspeople in Belarus